Events in the year 1963 in Cyprus.

Incumbents 

 President: Makarios III
 President of the Parliament: Glafcos Clerides

Events 

 The Cyprus Development Bank was established.

Deaths

References 

 
1960s in Cyprus
Years of the 21st century in Cyprus
Cyprus
Cyprus
Cyprus